Farben Lehre is a Polish punk band formed in 1986 by Wojciech Wojda and Marek Knap, playing their first concert on October 21 of that year in Płock. In 1990 the group won the coveted Jarocin Festival prize. The band's first album, Bez Pokory, was released in 1991, and since then they have been quite successful on the local and international punk rock scene.

Since 2004 Farben Lehre has organized the Punky Reggae Live festival.

Members

Current members
 Wojciech Wojda - lyrics, vocals
 Konrad Wojda - guitar
 Filip Grodzicki - bass
 Gerard Klawe - drums

Past members
 Marek Knap - drums (1986/1987)
 Piotr Kokoszczyński - bass, vocals (1986/1998)
 Paweł Nowak - acoustic guitar, vocals (1986/1987)
 Piotr Bartuś - drums (1987/1988)
 Bogdan Pawłowski - keyboards, vocals (1987/1989)
 Krzysztof Sieczkowski - drums (1988/1991)
 Bogdan Kiciński - guitar, vocals (1989/1998)
 Irek Bukowski - bass (1990)
 Paweł Małecki - guitar, vocals (1993/1995)
 Jacek Trafny - drums (1999/2002)
 Robert Chabowski - guitar, vocals (1986/1993 and 2002/2004)
 Adam Mikołajewski - drums

Discography

Studio albums

Video albums

References

External links 

  (in Polish)

Polish musical groups
Polish punk rock groups
Musical groups established in 1986
1986 establishments in Poland
Mystic Production artists